Shusht may refer to:
 Shusht-e Olya
 Shusht-e Sofla